Qaleh-ye Hajj Zu ol Faqar (also Romanized as Qal‘eh-ye Ḩājj Z̄ū ol Faqār) is a village in Hamaijan Rural District, Hamaijan District, Sepidan County, Fars Province, Iran. At the 2006 census, its population was 64, in 12 families.

References 

Populated places in Sepidan County